Gibraltar competed at the 2019 World Athletics Championships in Doha, Qatar, from 27 September–6 October 2019.

Result

Men 
Track and road events

References 

Nations at the 2019 World Athletics Championships
2019
World